The 2011 Medway Council unitary authority election took place on 5 May 2011. The Conservative Party won a majority on the council with 35 Councillors, The Labour Party came second with 15 councillors, and the Liberal Democrats third with 3 councillors. There are 2 independent councillors, There are a total of 55 seats on the council.

Results

Council Composition
Prior to the election the composition of the council was:

After the election the composition of the council was:

I - Independent

Ward results

Chatham Central

Cuxton and Halling

Gillingham North

Gillingham South

Hempstead and Wigmore

Lordswood and Capstone

Luton and Wayfield

Peninsula

Princes Park

Rainham Central

Rainham North

Rainham South

River

Rochester East

Rochester South and Horsted

Rochester West

Strood North

Strood Rural

Strood South

Twydall

Walderslade

Watling

References

2011 English local elections
2011
2010s in Kent